Mark Anthony Hughes (born 9 December 1986) is an English former professional footballer who is assistant manager at Plymouth Argyle. An Everton academy graduate, Hughes also played for clubs Northampton Town, Walsall, North Queensland Fury, Bury and Morecambe.

Career

Early senior career
Born in Liverpool, he joined Everton at the age of seven and progressed to the rank of reserve team captain. During his time at Everton, he spent a period in 2006 out on loan at Stockport County in League Two. He signed a new 1-year deal with Everton in April 2006 to keep him at the club until the summer of 2007.

He was a regular captain for the reserves team and made three appearances in the Everton first team. He started in the Football League Cup game against Peterborough United on 20 September 2006 which Everton won 2–1, and came on as a substitute at half time against Luton Town in the following League Cup match which Everton won 4–0, as well as making his Premier League debut on 3 December 2006, being substituted on in the final minutes of a 2–0 victory over West Ham United at Goodison Park.

He moved to Northampton Town on 31 January 2007 for an undisclosed fee and signed a two-year contract. He became a first choice centreback under Stuart Gray, and scored his first goal for the club against Rotherham United on 24 March.

In June 2009 he did not take up an offer of a new contract with Northampton Town. On 8 July, Hughes signed for League One club Walsall on a free transfer. He scored his first goal for the club in a 3–2 win at Wycombe Wanderers on 31 October 2009.

He was offered a new contract by Walsall on 10 May 2010.

North Queensland Fury
In June 2010, Hughes signed a contract with North Queensland Fury in the Australian A-League. The move came as a surprise, after signing contract acceptance forms with Walsall just one month earlier. He was given a role in the leadership group at the Fury upon arrival.

Hughes quickly made a name for himself in the A-League, having to turn down contracts offered by several other A-League clubs midway through the season, including Sydney FC. In total, he scored four goals for the season including one penalty. He went on to be named the Fury's best player of the season at the club's awards night, in addition to receiving the People's Choice Award and the Player's Player Award.

Hughes returned to England after North Queensland Fury ceased operations, and joined newly promoted League One club Bury, having to turn down an offer from A-League club Newcastle Jets.

Bury
Hughes signed a two-year contract with Bury on 21 June 2011, subject to a medical and international clearing. This made him new manager Richie Barker's first signing for the club. Hughes scored his first goal for Bury in the opening game of his second season at the club on 12 August 2012, where Bury suffered a 2–1 defeat to Middlesbrough in the League Cup.

Despite being a regular starter for Bury in the 2012–13 season, Hughes was loaned out to League Two side Accrington Stanley on 31 January 2013 for the remainder of the season. He made just five appearances for Accrington before returning to Bury early, after suffering a calf injury.

Hughes was released by Bury at the end of the 2012–13 season, along with fifteen other players, following the club's relegation to League Two. He made a total of 60 appearances for Bury in his two seasons at the club.

Morecambe
Following his release from Bury, Hughes signed a two-year deal with League Two club Morecambe on 9 July 2013, and was named as the new club captain on arrival. He was then released by Morecambe on 7 May 2015.

Stevenage
Following the release from Morecambe, Mark Hughes signed for Stevenage on 27 May 2015.
He was Teddy Sheringham's first summer signing. Hughes' first goal for the club was a late equaliser in a 2–2 draw with Newport County on 15 August 2015.

Accrington Stanley
On 29 January 2016, Hughes re-joined Accrington Stanley following his release from Stevenage, signing a short-term contract until the end of the season with the club he had spent time on loan at three years prior. On 30 April 2016, in the penultimate match of the season, Hughes scored his first goal for the club with a 78th-minute winner over Wycombe Wanderers that saw Accrington remain in second place, two points clear of fourth place. The season ultimately ended poorly for Accrington as, despite hitting the woodwork three times, they were held to a 0–0 draw by Stevenage on the final day of the season, with a 92nd-minute winner from Bristol Rovers' defender Lee Brown seeing Rovers sneak above Accrington into the third and final automatic promotion place, consigning Accrington to the play-offs. Hughes featured in both of the play-off semi final matches as Accrington lost 3–2 on aggregate to AFC Wimbledon.

Hughes was a part of the Accrington side that won the 2017–18 League Two title, featuring in all 46 league matches. Promotion to the third tier for the first time in the club's history was confirmed on 17 April 2018 when a double from Billy Kee saw Accrington defeat Yeovil Town. The title was confirmed on the penultimate day of the season with a 1–0 victory over Lincoln City. Hughes was rewarded for his efforts over the season with a place in the PFA League Two Team of the Year, along with two of his teammates, Sean McConville and Billy Kee. At the end of the season the club exercised a contractual option to retain him.

In July 2019, Hughes signed a new one-year contract extension with the club having the option for a second year to keep him until the end of the 2020–21 season.

On 27 March 2021, Hughes was forced off through injury in the 31' minute of what turned out to be his final appearance in an Accrington shirt, a 7–0 defeat to Peterborough United. Until this injury, Hughes had played every minute of the season. Hughes was offered a new contract with the club at the end of the 2020–21 season.

Bristol Rovers
On 26 May 2021, Hughes signed a one-year deal with League Two side Bristol Rovers, the side that had narrowly beaten Accrington to promotion five years previously. He opted against signing the contract extension. Hughes made his debut for the club on the opening day of the 2021–22 season, giving away a 96th-minute penalty for a foul on Oliver Hawkins that was converted by Danny Johnson to give Mansfield Town a 2–1 victory. Hughes picked up an Achilles injury in September 2021 in training that saw him out of action for the remainder of his time with the club, taking up a coaching role at times.

Coaching career

Plymouth Argyle
On 6 January 2022, Hughes joined the backroom staff of former Everton teammate Steven Schumacher by in the role of First Team Coach at Plymouth Argyle. Hughes became assistant manager in May 2022 following the departure of Keith Downing.

Career statistics

Honours
Accrington Stanley
League Two title: 2017–18

Individual
PFA Team of the Year: 2017–18 League Two

References

External links

1986 births
Living people
People from Kirkby
English footballers
Association football defenders
Everton F.C. players
Stockport County F.C. players
Northampton Town F.C. players
Walsall F.C. players
Premier League players
Northern Fury FC players
Bury F.C. players
Accrington Stanley F.C. players
Morecambe F.C. players
Stevenage F.C. players
Bristol Rovers F.C. players
English Football League players
A-League Men players
Expatriate soccer players in Australia
English expatriate footballers
English expatriate sportspeople in Australia
Plymouth Argyle F.C. non-playing staff
Association football coaches